Hart Haller (Hal) Empie (1909–2002) was an American artist, cartoonist, illustrator, teacher and pharmacist. He was best known for his portrayals of places and people of the American Southwest

Early life 
Hal Empie was born in a dirt-floored, one-room adobe near Safford, Arizona (territory) to pioneer settlers Allie and Hart Empie. As a young man, he worked at the Best Drug Store while attending grammar school. Upon graduation in 1927, he entered the University of Arizona in pre-med and then the Capitol College of Pharmacy in Denver Colorado. After passing exams in Colorado and Arizona, Hal was issued a special license to practice pharmacy before the age of twenty one, making him the youngest licensed pharmacist in Arizona History.

In 1929 Hal married Louise Reinhardt and in 1934 they purchased the drugstore in nearby Duncan, Arizona. He set up his easel in his pharmacy and painted between filling prescriptions.

Career 
A self-taught artist, Hal Empie refused to copy photographs. His only art lessons were six weeks studying the old master techniques with European master Frederic Taubes.

Artistic success began very early in Hal's career. National press brought invitationals including:  The Museum of Modern Art, the Polish Embassy, and the Los Angeles County Museum. He was in his twenties when he was first recognized by the American Federation of Arts in Washington D.C..

As a cartoonist, Hal created the famous Empie Kartoon Kards, the first western cartoon postcard copyright. He was a major contributor to early issues of Arizona Highways (magazine). Postcards were marketed in thirty-eight states. Original printings are housed in the Archives Center, National Museum of American History,  and The Smithsonian.

After a major Gila River flood in Duncan, the Empies moved to Tubac, Arizona and built the Hal Empie Studio and Gallery in 1986. Hal and Louise were married seventy-two years, raising three children. Hal painted his entire life. His career spanned over three quarters of a century, and at the time of his passing in 2002 he was the oldest continuous resident artist in Arizona

Recognition 
 Duncan, Arizona- Outstanding Citizen Award, 1939
 Arizona State Board of Pharmacy – 50 Years of Pharmacy, 1979
 University of Arizona Alumni Association – Distinguished Citizen Award, 1980
 History of Arizona Advisory Committee – Certificate of Recognition, 1982
 Arizona Pharmacy Board- Honorary Doctorate of Pharmacy, 1982
 Arizona Pharmacy Association- Honorary President, 1983
 Hal Empie Day- Safford, Arizona
 Key to the City- Safford, Arizona

Museum Collections 
 Amerind Museum
 Phippen Museum of Western Art
 Smithsonian National Museum of American History
 Billy Ireland Cartoon Library and Museum
 Syracuse University Library Special Collections
 Tucson Museum of Art
 Tubac Center of The Arts
 State of Arizona Supreme Court Building
 University of Arizona Pharmacy Museum 
 Arizona State Capitol Library

References

Additional Resources 
 Who's Who In American Art, Volume 3. R. R. Bowker, 1940
 Who's Who In American Art, Volume IV. American Federation of Arts, 1947
 Who's Who In The West. Chicago: Marquis - Who's Who, Inc., 1951
 Who's Who In American Art. Bowker, 1961
 Gilbert, Dorothy, ed. Who's Who In American Art. Washington D.C.: American Federation of Arts, 1962
 Manning, Reg. What Is Arizona Really Like? Regason Cartoon Books, 1968
 Opitz, Glen B. Dictionary of American Sculptors: 18th Century to the Present," Illustrated with Over 200 Photographs. Apollo Books, 1984
 Bender, George A. A History of Arizona Pharmacy. Arizona Pharmacy Historical Foundation, 1985
 Who's Who in the West 1985-86. Marquis Who's Who, 1985
 Who's Who in the World 1989-1990. Wilmette, Illinois:  Marquis Who's Who Inc., 1988
 The Red Book Western American Price Index. Southwest Art, 1993
 Southwest Art. Master Index 1971-1993. Boulder, CO: Southwest Art, 1993
 Cooper, Evelyn S. Arizona's Hal Empie. His Life, His Times and His Art. Arizona Historical Foundation 2001
 Art of the West Guidebook of Western Artists, 2001 Edition, Minnetonka, MN: Art of the West, 2001
 Davenport, Ray. Davenport's Art Reference, The Gold Edition 2005. Phoenix, AZ:  LTB Gordonsart, Inc., 2005
 Dunbier, Lonnie Pierson. The Artist’s Bluebook: 34,000 North American Artists to March 2005. 
 Kinsley, Shaw. Tubac: Images of America. Charleston, South Carolina: Arcadia Publishing, 2009 
 Herbert, Harold E.. Graham County: Images of America. Charleston, South Carolina: Arcadia Publishing, 2009 
 Davis, Neal F.. Meteor Crater: Images of America. Charleston, South Carolina: Arcadia Publishing, 2016 
 O'Bagy Davis, Carolyn. Cameron Trading Post: Images of America. Charleston, South Carolina: Arcadia Publishing, 2016
 Mark, Jay and Peters, Ronald L.. Buckhorn Mineral Baths and Wildlife Museum: Images of America. Charleston, South Carolina: Arcadia Publishing, 2017
 Western Art Collector, Jan. 2018, p. 88.
 Groves, Ann Empie. Way Out West: Hal Empie's Kartoon Kards, The Collection. The Artist's Daughter Publishing, 2019

External links 
 Official website
Tucson Museum of Art
Syracuse University Hal Empie Collection
Tubac Historical Society
Arizona Historical Society
Artists of Greenlee County
Billy Ireland Cartoon Museum Hal Empie Collection 
http://www.truewestmagazine.com/hal-empie/
 http://www.desertusa.com/desert-arizona/tubac-az.html
 Arizona State Library Braille and Talking Books, free lending library for the legally blind. "Arizona's Hal Empie. His Life, His Times, His Art"
 http://www.greenleecountyhistory.org/duncan.asp?tpm=1_3
 http://azmemory.azlibrary.gov/cdm/ref/collection/aho/id/421 p.49
 http://azmemory.azlibrary.gov/cdm/landingpage/collection/aho
 http://tubacvillager.com/blog/blog/2014/10/10/hal-empie-mural-saved/

American cartoonists
1909 births
2002 deaths
American pharmacists